"Open Your Heart" is a song by the British synthpop group The Human League. It was released as a single in the UK in October 1981 and peaked at number six in the UK Singles Chart. It was written jointly by lead singer Philip Oakey and keyboard player Jo Callis. The song features a lead vocal by Oakey and female backing vocals by Susanne Sulley and Joanne Catherall, analogue synthesizers by Jo Callis, Philip Adrian Wright and Ian Burden. Drum machines, sequencing and programming were provided by producer Martin Rushent.

Background
"Open Your Heart" was the third song from the Dare album. It was chosen by Virgin executive Simon Draper to be Dare'''s taster single, deliberately issued just three weeks in advance of the album. It quickly reached number six in the UK singles chart and raised the band's profile to the highest it had been to that point, and acted as a powerful promotional vehicle for the album.  The cover artwork and promotional video was deliberately coordinated with its parent album. 
It was the first Human League record sleeve to feature new band member Jo Callis, who co-wrote the song with Phil Oakey and who also wrote the B-side "Non-Stop" with Adrian Wright. In an interview in October 2009 Callis said, "I had started to work out both those tunes on guitar, playing along to an early drum machine which had about six preset drum patterns, Open Your Heart did translate better on the keyboard and I think we used the same drum machine with the same preset on the original demo which was done in the League's old 8 track studio in Sheffield".

Release
At the time, as a short-lived marketing tactic, The Human League were labeling their singles "Red" or "Blue" to help buyers differentiate between the band's musical styles.  "Open Your Heart" was  the first to be designated "Blue". When they were asked why, Susanne Sulley explained that "Red is for posers, for Spandy (Spandau Ballet) types."  Oakey added: "Blue is for ABBA fans."Smash Hits magazine wrote at the time: "You have to give the band their due. From being considered no-hopers, they're now Virgin's biggest (financial) hope. This is a number one. It's got everything - strong chorus, instant appeal and dreamboat topping."

The single entered the UK Singles Charts at no. 21 on 6 October 1981. The band appeared on Top of the Pops the same week to perform the song. The following week it reached its no. 6 peak staying there for two consecutive weeks. The promo video rather than a repeat of the studio appearance was shown on Top of the Pops on 22 October by which time the parent album "Dare" had been released, entering the UK album charts at no. 2.

B-side
"Non-Stop" is an upbeat instrumental track, written Callis and Wright which was also remixed for the 12" release of Open Your Heart. Unlike previous single B-side "Hard Times", it was not included on the remix album Love and Dancing.

Promotional video

The music video which accompanies the original version of "Open Your Heart" was the first video that the band recorded.  Previous Human League (Mk1) releases had been promoted with footage of the band onstage, interspersed with Philip Adrian Wright's slides and visuals. The preceding single "Love Action (I Believe in Love)" had originally been released without a video, but one was later recorded for its U.S. release in 1982.

Virgin Records and Oakey were keen to use the video to promote the future album as much as the current single, so video director Brian Grant borrowed heavily from the album’s imagery. The opening scene is a video montage of the portraits of the six band members exactly as they appear on the cover of the album. The band are all dressed and made up in the same style as Dare's photography. The video was shot in a studio on video tape and was mixed and enhanced using then cutting edge analogue video effects.  Imagery of Oakey dominated most scenes, cut in with Sulley and Catherall dancing in slow motion and static shots of Wright, Callis, Burden. The video ends with a lingering shot on the actual cover of the then-unreleased Dare''.

Track listing
 7" vinyl (Virgin VS453)
 "Open Your Heart" – 3:53
 "Non-Stop" – 4:15

 12" vinyl (Virgin VS453-12)
 "Open Your Heart/Non-Stop" – 8:15
 "Open Your Heart/Non-Stop (Instrumentals)" – 8:41

Charts

References

External links
Unofficial Human League Archive

The Human League songs
1981 singles
Songs written by Philip Oakey
Song recordings produced by Martin Rushent
Songs written by Jo Callis
1981 songs
Virgin Records singles